Trainz is a series of 3D train simulator video games. The Australian studio Auran (since 2007 N3V Games) released the first game in 2001.

The simulators consist of route and session editors called Surveyor, and the Driver module, that loads a route and lets the player operate and watch the trains run, either in "DCC" mode, which simulates a bare-bones Digital Command Control (DCC) system for the simple stop-and-go of a basic model railway, or "CAB" mode, which simulates real-world physics and adds working cab controls.

Overview

In the route editor, Surveyor, the user can shape the landscape, paint with ground textures, lay tracks, and place buildings and roads. The user then operates the trains in Driver, either in free play, or according to a scenario called a Driver Session (previously called Scenarios in the early versions of Trainz, Ultimate Trainz Collection, and TRS2004) which can range in difficulty from beginner to expert. In CAB (cabin) mode the train physics are more sophisticated than in DCC mode; adding real-life considerations such as wheel slip on the rails; how the weight of the consist slows acceleration and deceleration. Any train can be given directions to be driven by the computer.

Other software
The simulators are supported by a large library  of freeware assets which can be downloaded from the N3V servers, referred to as Download Station (DLS). Unless users purchase a First Class Ticket with real money, download speeds for the DLS (both in Content Manager and directly through File Transfer Protocol on the Trainz website) are throttled, which tends to be a point of contention in the Trainz community. PaintShed is a simple program for aiding and easing the process of 'reskinning' traincars, altering their livery, by recoloring and adding new heraldry to Trainz locomotives and other rolling stock. The Content Manager (CM) module is a Windows program that allows management of the in-game database files. It was renamed under the name of Content Manager Plus (CMP) in TRS2006.

Games

Trainz

While little-to-no information is known about this version of Trainz, it originally started life as a set of downloadable files in 2000.

Trainz 0.9 was the CD-ROM beta that was mailed to testers by Auran. Like the file set, nothing is known about this beta of Trainz.

Trainz Community Edition was released in December 2001. Service packs 1 (April), 2 (June) and 3 (November) were each released in 2002, these progressively updated the Community Edition, Trainz 1.0 to versions 1.1, 1.2, and 1.3 successively. Two retail builds (retail versions releases) existed; the English/USA version is commonly known as Trainz 1.0. (Box, which included Gmax as an accessory is shown at right in lower left corner.)

Trainz Retail Edition was released in June 2002 aimed at the United States and other North American markets.
Service pack 3 was released in November 2002, this updated both the Community and Retail Editions to version 1.3. Thus all USA versions are commonly known as Trainz 1.3.

The Ultimate Trainz Collection, or UTC, was released on 26 November 2002 in North America as a 3-CD set including extra rolling stock, and a CD-ROM with TrainzScript-based scenarios and route map content based on Trainz 1.3 tech. This was the first edition to include the formerly separately retailed PaintShed program and support RailDriver, as well as the first incorporating Trainz user developed freeware content as part of the release, some of which became Trainz staple content in TRS2004 et al. through current releases.

Trainz Railroad Simulator 2004
Trainz
Trainz Railroad Simulator 2004 (known as Trainz Railway Simulator 2004 in the United Kingdom), or
TRS2004, was released in September 2003. Trainz Railroad Simulator 2004 incorporated a load of technical changes and these required many bug fixes that were released as the four service packs released through 2004 and 2005.

Trainz Railroad Simulator 2004 was the first version of Trainz to include interactive industries and loadable rolling stock capabilities, which allow the player to deliver various resources (such as coal, wood, and steel) and passengers to various industries and stations across the playable area. There were many industries included and much of the bundled rolling stock was updated to include this new dynamic loading and unloading animated capability with a corresponding load-state dynamic driving physics change in the handling of a consist. It was also the first version of the Trainz series to have built-in steam engines.

Trainz Railroad Simulator 2004 Deluxe was a later 4 CDROM follow on with the first two service packs pre-installed. It also included PaintShed, and a bonus content CD.

This edition was also the first to support downloadable fan-made content, such as characters, buildings and scenery from the popular Thomas & Friends franchise, which has since seen the birth of a massive community on YouTube involving users recreating episodes of the series using Trainz, or creating their own original stories.

Trainz Railway Simulator 2006

Trainz Railway Simulator 2006 (known as Trainz Railroad Simulator 2006 in the USA), or TRS2006, was a transitional release, incorporating the stable Auran JET based TRS2004 GUI modules with only some graphics improvements, but introducing the data base manager Content Manager Plus (CMP) as a new core technology. ContentManager.exe (now called just CM) combines data base management, and secure FTP upload and download facilities and special user definable filters all in one integrated system. By defining a good filter, the user could 'selectively not see' the clutter of regional items in the Surveyor asset selection menus saving user time when world building. This important filtering feature was further improved in Trainz 2009, becoming far more powerful and easier to use. In addition to these improvements, several new routes were included, such as Hawes Junction (representing a small section of the Settle and Carlisle Railway and serving as a demo for TC3), Toronto Rail Lands 1954 (representing Toronto's sprawling railyard in 1954), and Marias Pass Approach (representing the BNSF Marias Pass line between Shelby, Montana and Cut Bank, Montana and serving as a demo for the full Marias Pass payware route). TRS2006 was published in September 2005, and the base release with its single service pack formed the core of the regional releases (most are joint ventures with 'Trainz Partners' combining payware content provider's products with the base Trainz software) over the next four years until the introduction of new technologies in TC3 and TRS2009. In Germany, it was published by Bluesky-Interactive, as ProTrain Perfect.

Trainz Driver

Trainz Driver (also known as Trainz Driver Edition (TDE) in the USA) is a version of Trainz Railroad Simulator 2006 released in 2005 lacking the Content Manager and Surveyor GUI world building module, having only the Driver and Railyard modules. Note this is precisely the formula utilized with the 2011-2016 release of iPhone and iPad based Trainz releases, as well as the new 'Driver 2016'.
 The package includes three large routes with 21 driver sessions, all set in North America. Trainz Driver is the first instance when Auran turned to blatant marketing measures to boost sales. Current CEO Tony Hilliam had taken on an increasing role in company management beginning in 2005, and by 2008 would end up a principle investor in Auran with rights to develop and distribute the Trainz franchise.
 Over the same three-year period, Auran licensed eight separate 'Regional releases' based on the stable JET2 (TRS2004/TRS2006) game engine<ref
name="Hilliam8">See other sections on this page: 1) Trainz Routes (Routes), 2) Trainz Driver (TDE), 3) Trainz the Complete Collection (TCC), the three Trainz Classics: 4-6) TC1, TC2, & TC3, 7) TRS2007 and 8) TRS2008</ref> releases aimed at opening new market niches. These versions had few game improvements,<ref
name="progressing">Neglecting Gcard interface (next footnote), only Trainz Classics 3, v2.8 had changes which impacted the data model guidelines content creators had to follow—and those affected virtually only locomotive modeling, leaving most content creation standards unchanged.</ref> and Driver and Surveyor were technically equivalent to The TRS2004-TRS2006 games, albeit, given new skins and better graphics interfacing. Prior to those releases, if you had a high end graphics system, to let the game know about your superior hardware you had to edit an ini file called TrainzOptions.txt with apropos height and width entries.

Trainz Railroad Simulator 2007

Trainz Railroad Simulator 2007 (abbreviated as TRS2007) was the second release targeting a regional market distributed by Anuman Interactive for sale in France, Belgium and Switzerland. There were initially two versions: the standard version which consisted of Trainz Railroad Simulator 2006 with Service Pack 1 applied, and the Gold edition, which included French regional add-on items.
 

TRS2008
 Halycon Media later distributed Trainz Railroad Simulator 2007 with German region-specific content for the British, Austrian, and Swiss market. This release version of TRS2007 was not available in American markets, though the Gold edition content was included in later games.

Trainz Classics (TC1—TC3)

Trainz Classics, also abbreviated as TC (TC1, TC2, TC3), is a series of 3 standalone Trainz Railroad Simulator 2006 joint venture customizations put together by Auran and different professional providers of third party content. Unlike typical Trainz releases which feature a round-the-world sampling of content typical to different regions of the planet, the Trainz Classics versions feature a large railroad layout with plenty of special professionally written sessions exploiting the featured railroad. Trainz Classics 3 renewed evolution of the Trainz base technologies incorporating various changes to the older stable four-year-old data models resulting in the publication of a new .pdf file TC3 Content Creator's Guide.

TC1 focuses on the Metro-North Railroad's Harlem Line in the 2000s (due to EMD FL9 locomotives still being in service), TC2 focuses on a freelanced city called "Modula City", featuring European trams running in the city and to an island (a demo version was included with TRS2004). TC3 focuses on the famed Settle-Carlisle Line from Skipton to Carlisle in the late 1950s/early 1960s during the steam-diesel transition.

Demos of Modula City and the Settle-Carlisle line were included in TRS2006, along with a limited amount of content in unrefined states.

The content from Trainz Classics 1 and 2 were later released as built-content for TS2009 and TS2010, and can be downloaded from the DLS for all future games. Trainz Classics 3 was re-released as an expansion pack for all subsequent games as the Settle & Carlisle Route, with extra content added from the original release (some of the Mark 1 coaches in BR Blue were also included by default in these versions due to being used in the consists of trains on the built-in East Coast Main Line routes).

Trainz – The Complete Collection
Released 13 June 2008. This is a large compilation, containing three DVD's: Ultimate Trainz Collection, TRS2004, TRS2006, Trainz Routes (volumes 1–4), and Trainz PaintShed.

Trainz Simulator 2009: World Builder Edition
Released in 2008, Trainz Simulator 2009 now has improved Surveyor capabilities and a new skin; the version contains the first actual software game engine advances that harnessed the increased RAM and video card memory asset utilizations and was the
TS2009/10 also support the new specs, additionally they support DXT graphic compression transparently, and multi-core processors which the earlier versions did not. When running under a 64 bit operating system these programs can use 4 gigs of memory, TC3 and earlier versions are limited to 2 gigs of memory

Trainz Simulator 2010: Engineer’s Edition
TS2010 introduced improved graphics capabilities and Speedtree technology with a new skin variant. TS2010-SP2 introduced the use of 64 bit processing while retaining a compatibility mode with older 32 bit computer architectures.

Service Pack 4 introduced an early version of multiplayer, but also controversially removed Compatibility Mode that enabled the use of older content that was marked "Faulty" due to stricter code enforcement.

Trainz Simulator: iPad, Android
To celebrate the 10th anniversary of Trainz, N3V Games released a Trainz app for the iPad on 4 December 2010. Users can lay tracks, drive trains. Users have access to Driver and Surveyor and can create routes and drive trains with the help of tutorials. An Android version of the game was released on 22 July 2011 and has the same features as the iPad version. The app is a port of Trainz Simulator 2009.

Trainz Simulator 12

Trainz Simulator 12, or TS12, was released on 12 April 2011. Among other upgrades, this product offers a variety of new routes, doppler effect support, satellite view, and a multiplayer feature for the first time (multiplayer was publicly tested in TS2010). A Trainz 10th Anniversary Boxset was announced which includes the game and other extras. The game was initially released for pre-order on 18 March 2011 as part of the limited-edition Trainz 10th Anniversary Collector's Edition. A certain amount of content from previous versions was removed from this release, making it the first release since Trainz 1.0 to feature all and only new routes and related assets. Like most Trainz releases, the package contains only content vetted for the new technology, which in TS12 needed to be updated for compatibility with 64 bit computers. However, much of the content (not all of it) from the previous versions was released on the Download Station (DLS) in an updated form as of the end of 2012 under an initiative known as the "Download Station Cleanup".

My First Trainz Set
My First Trainz Set was designed for the younger generation who do not want to worry about realism or management when playing the Trainz game. The game features 4 locations to lay track in that are based on rooms throughout a house, such as a bedroom or kitchen. The user has the ability to place down small toy-like objects in the replacement of buildings and scenery. However, its graphical quality of the trains, track, and objects is still very much like that of the standard Trainz simulator games. Controls are also far more simplified. The game was also ported to Android devices.

Trainz Simulator: Mac
Trainz Simulator: Mac was a port of Trainz Simulator: 2010 for Macintosh.

Trainz Driver: iPhone
Trainz Driver leveraged the work done porting Trainz Simulator onto iPad and brought the driving aspect of the Trainz franchise to mobile phones for the first time.

Trainz Simulator 2 Mac
Trainz Simulator 2 Mac was released on 27 March 2014 via the Mac App Store, which amongst other things, introduced an online multiplayer feature. It is a port of Trainz 12.

Trainz Driver 2: iPhone
Trainz Driver 2 leveraged the iPad updates and introduced the powerful route editing tools to the phone. It has TS2009’s game engine built into it.

Trainz: A New Era
Trainz: A New Era is, as noted in the new naming convention, a new beginning for the Trainz franchise. In November 2013, a Kickstarter campaign for the game was launched to help fund the game and the new purpose-built game engine. The campaign reached its target funding level a month later. Contributors were awarded prizes ranging from desktop wallpapers, First Class Tickets for the Download Station, full copies of the game, and various additional content depending on the amount pledged. 
 The game utilizes a new custom designed 64 bit game engine, which features far more realistic (lifelike) graphics, slightly improved train physics, and various other new features and improvements led by a top ten hit-list drawn up by the user community on the forums between September and November 2013.
 Subsequently, a download only release, the 'TANE Community Edition' was released in mid-December 2014. The new game was officially released as a retail version for wide distribution on 15 May 2015, though it was rather bare bones, lacking many normal User Interface features such as Content Manager hotkeys, a working minimap and like UX multiplier factors.
 A whole series of bug fixing hotfix software updates were forthcoming throughout the year, and often these would incrementally improve UI lacks and so gradually raise the UX. A long delayed Service Pack 1 finally passed a succession of hurdles which had new BETA Candidate Replacements updating the last until finally six-to-seven weeks late, a SP1 release build heralded a new stage of stability and capability in mid-January, 12 January 2016 instead of Halloween. Major Kickstarter contributors also could participate in Beta testing in addition to a dedicated in-house employee team testing new code; so hundreds participated in moving the new technology into matured stability. Two hotfixes followed after just a month and a half, one after the other a week apart on 11 March 2016 (build 81190) and 18 March 2016 (build 81296), but normal UI to recapture UX operations of earlier Trainz aside from Driver, are still lacking in hotfix2. Several of the CM hotkeys were reinstated with the second hotfix, and N3V has announced that Service Pack 2 beta candidate builds will be forthcoming soon, implying the rapid rebuilding of the Trainz customary UX may not be far behind.

Trainz Railroad Simulator 2019 

On 11 May 2018, N3V Games announced a new version of Trainz featuring better graphics, Physically-Based Rendering, Parallax Occlusion Mapping and more content than ever before. Early Access was made in July 2018 and the game was officially launched 7 January 2019. It is also the first entry in the series since TRS2006 to feature the "Trainz Railroad Simulator" moniker. Possibly to avoid confusion with "Train Simulator" by Dovetail Games. The game uses whole-game DRM in all versions, whereas certain versions of Trainz: A New Era could be purchased and run offline. This requires that the game is connected to the internet at least once a month in order for the game and content to continue functioning. TRS19 is primarily being offered as subscription model, although a one-time purchase (but with the monthly DRM check still required) is also available via the Trainz Store and Steam. It also has the ability to download content from the Download Station (DLS) while in the game; though without the purchase of so-called "first class tickets" (limited-duration speed upgrades) the download speed is severely throttled.

Full Editions

There are two editions offered:
 Standard Edition - The baseline version, which includes six routes: Kickstarter County 2 (an updated version of the Kickstart County route from T:ANE), Canadian Rockies - Golden, BC (featuring the Canadian Pacific Mountain and Wildemere subdivisions, on which the Rocky Mountaineer runs), Sebino Lake, Italy (representing the Ferrovienord line from Brescia to Pisogne in the 1980s), Niddertalbahn (representing Main-Weser-Bahn from Bad Vilbel to Stockheim), Edinburgh-Dundee (representing the East Coast Main Line from Edinburgh Waverley to Dundee in 1976, serving as an extension of the main ECML route from King's Cross to Edinburgh in T:ANE), and Cornish Mainline and Branchlines (representing the Cornish Main Line and its associated branchlines just after the formation of British Railways in 1948)
 Platinum Edition - this includes everything in the standard edition plus unified camera and surveyor options, and an additional content bundle

Regional Editions 
2019 saw the release of regional versions, with content (routes, locomotives, etc.) specific to certain parts of the world (and only those parts):
 World Edition - Containing all six routes and related content, this is a new name for the standard edition
 North American Edition - Only comes with Kickstarter Country 2 and Golden, BC
 United Kingdom Edition - Only comes with Kickstarter Country 2, Edinburgh-Dundee, and Cornish Mainline and Branchlines
 European Edition - Only comes with Kickstarter Country 2, Niddertalbahn, and Sebino Lake, Italy

Subscriptions 
A different way of purchasing Trainz is by paying a monthly subscription cost. This gives you access to the game and its contents as long as you remain a subscriber.
 Trainz Plus Membership - This gives you access to the standard game and all updates, as well as accelerated downloads ("first class ticket")
 Trainz Gold Membership - In addition to the Plus membership, you gain access to pre-release content, "nearly all" DLC, and promotional features

Trainz Simulator 3: Mobile
A port of Trainz Railroad Simulator 2019 for mobile devices was released around August 2021. The game currently comes with 4 routes, one of them being based on a fictional high-speed line in Sweden used by the ETR 1000, an Italian high-speed train. The line is most likely based on the Swedish SJ X2000 high-speed trainset used between Copenhagen and major cities in Sweden such as Stockholm, Malmö or Göteborg. Another route involves the Rocky Mountains featuring the Rocky Mountaineer, and some CSX freighters. Despite the game not having a route based in China, there are Chinese trains available for purchase such as the SS4, an electric locomotive used for cargo operations

Trainz Railroad Simulator 2022 
The next major release of Trainz was announced in November 2021, with preorders starting December 1. This major release will start on November 31, 2021.Routes included in the base game besides Kickstarter County 2 from TRS2019 include:

 West From Denver, representing the Union Pacific mainline from Denver to Hot Sulphur Springs, Colorado
 Schwäninger Land, a freelance route set in modern Germany
 Liskeard to Looe, representing the Looe Valley Line in Cornwall from the Privatisation of British Rail to modern Great Western Railway operations
 Bairnsdale to Orbost, representing the Gippsland railway line in the 1970s
 Beloreck - South Ural Mountains, representing the South Urals Railway

New features include Multiplayer Surveyor (tested in TRS2019 closed betas), the unification of Driver and Surveyor that allows seamless switching between the two, new effect layer tools and presets, the ability to bulk paint textures under splines, new camera options beyond the original four (including Walk, Car, Fly, and Drone), an in-game content store, and support for game controllers. There is also an improved version of the world building tool called Surveyor 2.0 or S20. This is only available if an annual membership is paid. It is not available if an outright purchase is made.

Special hardware support 
The desktop cab controller RailDriver was first supported for use in Service Pack 1 for the Ultimate Trainz Collection, and is also supported by all subsequent Trainz releases.

Reception
Trainz was a runner-up for GameSpots annual "Best Simulation on PC" award in 2002.

References

External links

 Trainz Simulator official website
 Auran official website

Android (operating system) games
IOS games
MacOS games
Train simulation video games
Video games developed in Australia
Video game franchises
Video game franchises introduced in 2001
Windows games